Manuel Corrales (born 3 August 1982) is a Peruvian footballer who currently plays for Cusco FC, as a left back.

Club career
He played for French club FC Metz. In 2008, he returned to his home country to once again play for Alianza Lima. In 2010, he joined Universidad César Vallejo. In 2011, he returned once again to Alianza Lima.

References

External links 

Manuel Corrales at FC Metz.com

1982 births
Living people
Footballers from Lima
Association football fullbacks
Peruvian footballers
Peru international footballers
Estudiantes de Medicina footballers
Club Deportivo Universidad César Vallejo footballers
Club Alianza Lima footballers
FC Metz players
León de Huánuco footballers
Universidad Técnica de Cajamarca footballers
Ayacucho FC footballers
Carlos A. Mannucci players
Peruvian Primera División players
Ligue 1 players
Peruvian expatriate footballers
Peruvian expatriate sportspeople in France
Expatriate footballers in France